New Mexico v. Texas, 275 U.S. 279 (1927), was a United States Supreme Court case that determined the boundary between Texas and New Mexico in the vicinity of El Paso, Texas.

Background

Each State asserted that the true boundary line is the middle of the channel of the Rio Grande in 1850. Neither alleged that there had been any change in this line by accretions. And the only issue was as to the true location of the channel in that year.  New Mexico believed it was closer to the then-present course of the river.  Texas had been issuing deeds for the area known as the Country Club Area, as this was the land in dispute, the case became known by the moniker the Country Club Dispute.

History of the case
This case was filed by the State of New Mexico in the Supreme Court of the United States under the original jurisdiction provisions of Article III, Section 2 of the U.S. Constitution.  A master was appointed by the Supreme Court in 1924 to make determinations of fact, and the master made extensive findings.  "The master concluded on all the evidence that the allegations in New Mexico's bill as to the location and course of the Rio Grande 'as it existed in the year 1850' were not sustained, and that the river did not then flow on the eastern side of the valley as claimed by New Mexico; that its location and course in 1850 was, in general, as alleged in the cross- bill of Texas."

Supreme Court holding
The unanimous Court held that "the testimony of ancient witnesses called by New Mexico as
to their recollection of the old river, is far from satisfactory, and
does not, in view of the other evidence, sustain the burden resting
on New Mexico".

See also
Florida v. Georgia
New Hampshire v. Maine

References

External links

 

United States Supreme Court cases
United States Supreme Court cases of the Taft Court
United States Supreme Court original jurisdiction cases
Internal territorial disputes of the United States
1927 in United States case law
1927 in New Mexico
1927 in Texas
Legal history of New Mexico
Legal history of Texas
Geography of El Paso County, Texas
Texas border disputes